Michael David Lindup (born 17 March 1959) is a musician best known as the keyboard player and falsetto-voiced singer who joined Mark King and brothers Phil and Boon Gould to form the British jazz-funk/pop rock band Level 42.

Early life
Lindup was born in London, England. He attended Chetham's School of Music in Manchester, where he studied piano, percussion and composition, and sang in senior and chamber choirs, later graduating to the Guildhall School of Music and Drama. There, his musical experience spread to include playing orchestral percussion in concert at the Royal Festival and Albert Halls, drums and keyboards in jazz ensembles and participating in pop workshops.

In 1985, he played in the bateria of the London School of Samba in the Notting Hill Carnival. Three founder members of the LSS subsequently played on his first solo LP Changes in 1990.

Career

Since July 2000, he has been part of the live line-up of UK/Brazilian outfit Da Lata, playing keyboards, percussion and providing backing vocals, who have been performing from clubs to festivals in the UK and Europe, U.S., Canada, Japan, South Africa and China.

In 2006, he rejoined Level 42, replacing Lyndon Connah, for touring appearances and the recording of the album Retroglide.

In 2009, he appeared on Phil Gould's first solo album, Watertight.

In 2012, he dueted with Leee John on a version of "Something About You" at the Leicester Square Theatre, London.

Personal life
His mother is the actress, singer and songwriter Nadia Cattouse and his father was David Lindup.

Discography

 Changes (1990, Resurgence Records)
 "Changes" (6:32)
 "Lovely Day" (4:26)
 "Fallen Angel" (6:14)
 "The Spirit is Free" (4:48)
 "Desire" (4:38)
 "West Coast Man" (4:37)
 "Judgement Day" (5:44)
 "Life Will Never Be the Same" (4:41)
 "Paixao" (5:40)
 "Jung" (6:56)
 Conversations with Silence (2003, Naim Records)
 "Sunshine and Showers" (2:43)
 "Beauty on a Grey Day" (4:16)
 "Heart of the Matter" (5:54)
 "Beautiful One" (5:03)
 "Theme" (1:08)
 "Variation 1" (0:53)
 "Variation 2" (1:27)
 "Variation 3" (2:14)
 "Finale" (3:13)
 "El Rincon Cubano" (7:06)
 "Hero's Return" (6:11)
 "Waking Up to Love" (7:40)
 "Walking the Path" (4:04)
 "Brasil 2000" (5:51)
 "Last Night Without You" (4:56)
 On the One (EP: 2011)
 "Madness" (4:59)
 "Angelo" (5:20)
 "Love Is the Answer" (4:43)
 "On the One" (5:51)
 "Promised Land" (5:02)
 "Song for Zane" (7:31)
 "Changes 2" (The track listing for this album is TBC but the first single was released on 11 June 2021)
 "Time To Let Go" (5:17)
 "You Can't Just Live As An Island" (5:09)
 Atlantia (3:40)

References

External links
 Mike Lindup's official website
 Official Level 42 website
 
 

1959 births
Black British rock musicians
Living people
English keyboardists
English male singers
Singers from London
Level 42 members
English people of Belizean descent